Mahamat Hissein (born on 3 March 1979) is a Chadian footballer, who plays for French clubs.

Career
Hissein spent four seasons playing in Ligue 2 for FC Istres and FC Gueugnon.

Position
Having spent his entire career in France, he plays as an attacker.

International career
Hissein has been selected for the national team.

Clubs
1997–1999 : Renaissance FC
1999 : Kadji Sports Academy
1999–2000 : K. Sint-Truidense V.V.
2000–2001 : Vergèze
2001–2002 : Olympique Alès
2002–2004 : FC Istres
2004–2006 : FC Gueugnon
2006–2007 : US Orléans
2007–2010 : AS Moulins
2010–2012 : AS Yzeure

See also
 List of Chad international footballers

References

External links
 

1979 births
Living people
Chadian Muslims
Chadian footballers
Olympique Alès players
FC Istres players
FC Gueugnon players
Chadian expatriates in Cameroon
US Orléans players
Sint-Truidense V.V. players
AS Moulins players
Chadian expatriates in France
Kadji Sports Academy players
People from N'Djamena
Chad international footballers
Association football forwards